The Monument to Belarusians who died for Ukraine in Kyiv is the memorial sign dedicated to the Belarusians who died during the events at Euromaidan and Russian-Ukrainian war. The memorial was opened on March 28, 2016. It is located on the building number 22 on the Belarusian street in Kyiv.

Review 
The monument is made in the colors of the 1918 national flag of Belarus (White-red-white) and includes an image of the Belarusian national emblem "Pahonia" (Pursuit).

At the memorial sign posted the names and photos of three persons:

 Michaił Žyźnieŭski, who died during the Revolution of Dignity from a bullet;
 Aleś Čarkašyn, who fought in the Tactical group "Belarus" and was killed in Donbas in August 2015 during the Anti-Terrorist Operation;
 Vital Ciliženka, who fought in the Tactical group "Belarus" and was killed in Donbas in August 2015 during the Anti-Terrorist Operation.

The author of the monument is Hlib Hrzhabovsky. The sculptor's son was killed during the Battle of Donetsk Airport. Hrzhabovsky agreed to participate in the project as a volunteer.

External links 
 Monument to Belarusians who died for Ukraine was opened in Kyiv // Belsat TV
 У КИЄВІ ВІДКРИЛИ ПАМ'ЯТНИК БІЛОРУСАМ, ЯКІ ЗАГИНУЛИ НА МАЙДАНІ ТА В АТО // Channel 5, Ukraine 
 Мэмарыяльны знак беларусам, якія загінулі за Ўкраіну, адкрыты ў Кіеве // svaboda.org 
 В Киеве появился знак памяти белорусам-героям // belaruspartisan.org 

Monuments and memorials in Kyiv
Belarus–Ukraine relations